"Call Me" is a song written and recorded by American singer Aretha Franklin. The song was co-produced by Jerry Wexler, Tom Dowd and Arif Mardin.

Background
Franklin came up with the idea for the song after she saw a young couple engaged in deep conversation on New York's Park Avenue. Before they parted, Franklin heard them say to each other: "I love you... call me." With the exception of Franklin on piano, musical backing for "Call Me" was handled by members of the Muscle Shoals Rhythm Section.

Chart performance
"Call Me" was released as a single in January 1970 from Aretha's This Girl's in Love with You album and became another hit for her, spending two weeks at number one on the US R&B Singles chart, while reaching number 13 on the Pop chart.

Personnel
Credits are adapted from the liner notes of This Girl's in Love with You.

Main performance
Aretha Franklin – vocals, acoustic piano, additional keyboards
Brenda Bryant – background vocals
Cissy Houston – background vocals
Pat Lewis – background vocals

Muscle Shoals Rhythm Section
Barry Beckett – electric piano, Hammond organ
Roger Hawkins – drums
Eddie Hinton – guitar
David Hood – bass
Jimmy Johnson – guitar

Production
Ron Albert – engineer 
Tom Dowd – producer
Chuck Kirkpatrick – engineer
Arif Mardin – producer, arranger
Jerry Wexler – producer

Cover versions
Diana Ross's rendition of the song for her 1971 album Everything Is Everything. This version was nominated for a Grammy in the Best Female R&B Vocal Category. 
In 1991, R&B singer Phil Perry recorded a version of this song for his album, The Heart of the Man, which reached number one on the Hot R&B Singles Chart.

Samples
Danny! sampled it in 2004 for his song "When You Get There"
Later in 2004, Kanye West also sampled it for Slum Village's hit "Selfish".

See also
R&B number-one hits of 1970 (USA)
R&B number-one hits of 1991 (USA)

References

1970 songs
Aretha Franklin songs
Songs written by Aretha Franklin
Song recordings produced by Arif Mardin
Song recordings produced by Jerry Wexler
Song recordings produced by Tom Dowd
1970s ballads
Soul ballads
1970 singles
1991 singles
Atlantic Records singles